Dodsworth may refer to:
 Dodsworth (novel), a 1929 novel by Sinclair Lewis
 Dodsworth (play), a 1934 play adapted from the novel
 Dodsworth (film), a 1936 film adapted from the novel
 Dodsworth, a Producer's Showcase 1956 teleplay based on the novel
 Anna Dodsworth (c. 1740–1801), British romantic poet
 Roger Dodsworth (1585–1654), English antiquary
 Matthew Dodsworth (c.1544–1631), English judge
 Geoffrey Dodsworth (born 1928), British politician
 Any of the Smith-Dodsworth Baronets